Heskins Ltd is a specialist manufacturer of self-adhesive abrasive safety tape, grip tape and heavy duty line marking products. It was established in 1997 as an adhesive coater, rapidly diversifying into its now familiar range. Heskins attained ISO9000 status in May 2001, acquiring Investors in People acclamation in 2006. More recently, Heskins have been presented with an ISO 14001 certificate due to their environmental approach to their manufacturing techniques.

It operates from three facilities based in three countries on two continents. Its head office and main production facility is located at Brinscall, Chorley, UK. Heskins other European location opened in the Netherlands in 2021 under the sister company name Heskins BV.

Heskins owns the trademarks Safety-Grip, Aqua-Safe, PermaStripe, PermaRoute, Tenura, H3418 and H4644.

The PermaStripe brand is a range of floor marking tape designed to effectively mark out aisles, bays, escape routes and other areas within factories and warehouses. Combining 5 different types of floor and line marking tapes named PermaStripe, PermaStripe Smooth, PermaRoute, PermaLean and PermaTop.

Tenura is a manufacturer of silicone daily living aids, designed to aid in day to day tasks. Since being established in 2011, Tenuras range has expanded dramatically, becoming more versatile in the silicone daily living aids it supplies.

Heskins also has an office and production site in Butler, Pennsylvania, USA. The sister company, originally named NonSlip Tapes LLC, was set up in 2009, with a small team dedicated to finding and dealing with business in North America and beyond. Now it operates Heskins LLC, a wholesale supplier aimed at the B2B market.

External links
Official site
Heskins Blog
Tenura site
US Official site
PermaStripe site
PermaStripe US Official site

Online Videos
Applying antislip tape
Grip tape conformable applied onto chequer plate
Non slip tape internal application

References

Manufacturing companies established in 1997
Manufacturing companies of the United Kingdom